Xyliphius magdalenae is a species of banjo catfish endemic to Colombia where it is found in the Magdalena River basin.  It grows to a length of 8.0 cm.

References 
 

Aspredinidae
Freshwater fish of Colombia
Endemic fauna of Colombia
Magdalena River
Fish described in 1912
Taxa named by Carl H. Eigenmann